Decter is a surname. Notable people with the surname include:

Duke Decter (born 1970), American guitarist and entertainer
Ed Decter (born 1959), American film director
Midge Decter (born 1927), American journalist and author
Moshe Decter (1921-2007), American Jewish activist
Shari Decter Hirst, Canadian politician